Julia Brown (died after 1860) was an American madam and prostitute active in mid-nineteenth century New York City. Brown has been described as "the best-known prostitute in antebellum America". Brown was known for playing the piano in her brothel and for being a guest at functions hosted by the best families in New York. She also had season ticket to two theaters, paid for pews in various churches and contributed generously to local bible societies. She became a popular subject of tourist guidebooks, and her name appears often in diaries from the  period.

Brothel-keeping
In the 1830s, Brown entered a brothel run by Rosina Townsend, and later a house owned by Adeline Miller, a well-known New York madam, in Miller Street, eventually becoming the manager of the house. She did not stay long, however; soon Brown was running a brothel of her own at 133 Reade Street. After a complaint from a neighbor, she was charged with common bawdy house. She pleaded guilty and shut the Reade Street premises, but continued to run brothels on Chapel, Church and Leonard Streets. Brown popularized the brothel ball, which were a risqué masked parties attended by some of New York's elite. These balls were well reported in the press. The Dixon's Polyanthos, a weekly with a circulation of around 10,000, carried a story on "Princess Julia's Palace of Love" in June 1941.

The Leonard Street brothel was partially destroyed when the neighboring National Theater burnt down in 1841, and the rear wall of the theater collapsed on the brothel. A young woman, Margaret Yahgar, was killed by the fire that spread into the Brothel. Yahgar had left her parents home in Philadelphia a few days before to "board" with Brown. Brown allegedly sent her employees to save furniture and decor from the burning building. These were used to furnish her new “two thousand dollar parlor house" at another property in Leonard Street. The new brothel in Leonard Street became one of the most famous brothel in New York City, Fanny White, a.k.a. Jane Augusta Blankman once worked there.

Vigilantes frequently violently targeted brothels in the area. Brown's brothel in Chapel Street was attacked in 1834, and following another attack in 1840, two men were found guilty of assaulting Brown and her prostitutes.

As the Lower West Side pushed north, Brown moved with it. By the 1860s, Brown was running a stylish brothel at the corner of University Place and 12th Street. Her neighbours included James Lenox, William H. Aspinwall, the socialite Mrs Peter A. Schemerhorn and New York Public Library. The brothel was tolerated because the house and her customers caused no disruption.

Social acceptance
Despite her illicit occupation, Brown was a darling of the New York upper class. She received invitations to social galas across New York City, and her admirers nicknamed her Princess Julia. She sometimes threw balls of her own in the winter as a way to attract new patrons. Charles Dickens reportedly visited her on a trip through America. The penny press also followed her exploits; the major criticism levied against her was that the cut she took from her girls' earnings was too large. She was reputed to be worth $11,500.

References

Bibliography
 
 
 
 
 
 
 
 
 

Criminals from New York City
American prostitutes
Year of birth missing
Year of death missing
American brothel owners and madams
19th-century American businesswomen
19th-century American businesspeople